12 Pashons - Coptic calendar - 14 Pashons

Fixed commemorations
All fixed commemorations below are observed on 13 Pashons (21 May) by the Coptic Orthodox Church.

Saints
Saint Arsenius (450 A.D.)

References
Coptic Synexarion

Days of the Coptic calendar